The 2019 Special Honours in New Zealand was a Special Honours List, published in New Zealand on 4 March 2019. An appointment was made to the New Zealand Order of Merit to recognise the incoming chief justice, Helen Winkelmann.

New Zealand Order of Merit

Dame Grand Companion (GNZM)
Additional
 The Honourable Helen Diana Winkelmann – Chief Justice Designate

References

Special honours
Special honours
Special Honours